Clarksville is an unincorporated community in Wagoner County, Oklahoma, United States. It is located three miles south of Porter on N. 4210 Road.

Unincorporated communities in Oklahoma
Unincorporated communities in Wagoner County, Oklahoma